Army General Gabriel Amisi Kumba (Tango Four) was Chief of Staff of the Forces Terrestres, the army of the Democratic Republic of the Congo. Amisi was a former Forces armees Zairoises (FAZ) officer who was recruited into the Alliance of Democratic Forces for the Liberation of Congo (AFDL) in 1996. During the Second Congo War, Amisi was assistant chief of staff for logistics of the Rally for Congolese Democracy (RCD-G). This position was the origin of his nickname, as T-4 was the abbreviation for his position. He was implicated by Human Rights Watch in the execution of soldier Joe Lona Bifuko and in the torture of prisoners in the ANC military intelligence detention centre in Goma in 2001.

He became famous for the repression of a mutiny in Kisangani in May 2002.

After the Kisangani massacre, he commanded an ANC brigade based at Mbuji-Mayi. In September 2002, it allegedly took part in the executions of 82 civilians and Mayi-Mayi fighters in Kindu in a military operation together with the Rwandan Defence Forces.

He was the former commander of the 8th Military Region in North Kivu, appointed in January 2005. In August 2006, it appears he was moved from command of the 8th Military Region to become chief of staff of the FARDC Land Forces (Forces Terrestre). There are credible allegations, some made by the BBC, that General Kumba personally profited from his position, benefiting from mining in the east of the country, during the past few years.

Many reports link Amisi to mining operations in North Kivu. In particular, Amisi appears to have protected and profited from the operations of Colonel Samy Matumo, the former commander of the 85th Brigade that occupied the Bisie mine for several years. 
The report, written for the U.N. by the specialist Group of Experts on the DRC, said that Amisi oversaw a network providing arms and ammunition to criminal groups and rebels who roam the hills and forests of Congo's resource-rich but troubled east.  According to the report, ammunition bought in neighboring Congo Brazzaville, is smuggled through the Congolese capital Kinshasa to the east by a close network of Amisi's associates, including members of his family.

On 22 November 2012, Amisi was suspended from his position in the Forces Terrestres by president Joseph Kabila due to his alleged role in the arms sales to rebel groups in the eastern part of the country, which may have implicated the rebel group M23.

Sanctions were announced by the United States on 28 September 2016 because units under his command had "reportedly [have] engaged in violent repression of political demonstrations”, including January 2015 protests in which at least 42 people died. As a result  U.S. citizens were stopped from financial transactions with him. These measures were seen as a warning to president Joseph Kabila to respect the country's constitution.

In 2017 a UN report alleged that Amisi was mining gold on the Awimi River in Tshopo province, and that the management of La Conquete, a company he allegedly owns, were guarded by Congo’s military (FARDC).

References

http://www.chicagotribune.com/news/sns-rt-us-congo-democratic-amisibre8ak1j1-20121121,0,5590121.story

Further reading
Nicholas Garrett; Sylvia Sergiou; Koen Vlassenroot, 'Negotiated Peace for Extortion: the case of Walikale territory in Eastern DR Congo,' Journal of Eastern African Studies, vol. 3, issue 1, 2009

External links
https://web.archive.org/web/20120319085549/http://lesoldatdupeuple.over-blog.com/article-gabriel-amisi-alias-tango-fort-un-general-des-fardc-tres-tango-fort-sur-le-champ-de-bataille-des-massacres-des-mines-d-or-et-du-commercialisme-militaire-60926771.html

Democratic Republic of the Congo military personnel
Living people
Year of birth missing (living people)
21st-century Democratic Republic of the Congo people